This article will be a family tree of Serbian monarchs that includes only monarchs 
and their descendants who are relevant to the succession.

High Middle Ages

References

Sources

 

 

Serbian monarchy
Serbian